Laurent Nouvion (born 25 March 1968) is a Monegasque politician and attorney who was the  President of the National Council in Monaco from 2013 to 2016. While a National Councillor, Nouvion led the opposition against Jean-François Robillon's ruling party, Union Monegasques. In the 2013 parliamentary election, Nouvion's coalition, Horizon Monaco won control of the National Council, and as such, Nouvion became the twelfth President of the National Council.

References

External links
Laurent Nouvion at the  National Council

Living people
1968 births
Presidents of the National Council (Monaco)
Chassériau family